During the 2008–09 English football season, Doncaster Rovers F.C. competed in the Football League Championship.

Season summary
Doncaster endured a tough start to life in the second tier of English football and stood bottom of the league after 24 games with only 4 league wins. However, Doncaster went on an eight-match unbeaten run that lifted them to mid-table, and finished the season in a secure 14th place, above more fancied sides like Crystal Palace and Derby County.

Kit

Squad
Squad at end of season

Left club during season

Notes

References

Doncaster Rovers
Doncaster Rovers F.C. seasons